John Luther Long (January 1, 1861 – October 31, 1927) was an American lawyer and writer best known for his short story "Madame Butterfly", which was  based on the recollections of his sister, Jennie Correll, who had been to Japan with her husband—a Methodist missionary.

Biography
Born in Hanover, Pennsylvania, Long had been admitted to the bar in Philadelphia on October 29, 1881, and become a practicing lawyer. On January 17, 1882, he married Mary Jane Sprenkle. He died at age 66 on October 31, 1927, having spent the last two months of his life at a sanatorium in Clifton Springs, New York. The obituary in The New York Times of November 1, 1927, quoted his own interpretation of himself as "a sentimentalist, and a feminist and proud of it".

With David Belasco he wrote the four act play Adrea which starred Mrs. Leslie Carter and which ran for 123 performances at the first Belasco Theatre. His one act play Dolce was staged at the Manhattan Theater on April 24, 1906, starring Minnie Maddern Fiske.

References

External links
 John Luther Long Papers at the Harry Ransom Center
 
 
 
 
 Madame Butterfly, The Century Volume 55 Issue 3 (Jan 1898) pp. 374–393
 Madame Butterfly 1903 Grosset and Dunlap "Japanese Edition" with photogravure illustrations by C. Yarnall Abbott (1870–1938)
 David Belasco's Play Madame Butterfly, A Tragedy of Japan (from "Six Plays" Little, Brown 1928)
 John Luther Long, American Studies at The University of Virginia.

American short story writers
American opera librettists
1861 births
1927 deaths
Writers from Philadelphia
People from Cheltenham, Pennsylvania
19th-century American lawyers